Gretchen Lynn Polhemus-Jensen (born May 12, 1965) is an American actress, journalist, and beauty pageant titleholder who won Miss USA 1989 and second runner-up to .

Early life
Prior to competing in Miss Texas USA, Jensen was working as a cattle broker and realtor in her home state.

Miss Texas USA
Jensen competed as Miss Bedford USA in the 14th edition of the Miss Texas USA pageant in 1987 and received the Photogenic award, ultimately placing second runner-up to eventual winner, Courtney Gibbs.

Miss USA 1989
As the official representative of her state to the 1989 Miss USA pageant, held in Mobile, Alabama, Jensen captured the crown of Miss USA, becoming its 38th titleholder, and the last of five consecutive winners from Texas during the 1980s.

At the 1989 Miss Universe pageant, she placed fifth in semifinal interview, fourth in swimsuit and eighth in evening gown, advancing to the competition's Top 5 finalists, and ultimately finishing second runner-up to eventual winner, Angela Visser of the Netherlands.

Life after Miss USA
In 1993, Jensen appeared in the made-for-TV-movie Bonanza: The Return with Ben Johnson and Michael Landon Jr., and worked as a sports correspondent for ESPN and for a CBS affiliate as a news correspondent. She was also a judge at the 2003 Miss USA pageant, resides in Salt Lake City's metropolitan area and is now a divorced mother of five. Her daughter, Baylee is Miss Utah USA 2017. She was formerly a co-host of KTVX-TV's "Good Things Utah".

References

External links
Official Miss USA website - Past titleholders

1965 births
Living people
Miss Universe 1989 contestants
Miss USA 1989 delegates
Miss USA winners
20th-century American people